A fansite, fan site, fan blog or fan page is a website created and maintained by a fan or devotee about a celebrity, thing, or particular cultural phenomenon.

Fansites may offer specialized information on the subject (e.g., episode listings, biographies, storyline plots), pictures taken from various sources, the latest news related to their subject, media downloads, links to other, similar fansites, and the chance to talk to other fans via discussion boards. They often take the form of a blog, highlighting the latest news regarding the fansite subject. They often include galleries of photos or videos of the subject and are often "affiliates" with other fansites.

Fanlistings are another common type of unofficial fansite, though they are much simpler than general fansites, and are designed simply to list fans of a certain subject who have chosen to submit their names (and sometimes links to their home pages). Many do not contain much information on the subject at all, aside from a small introduction. They are generally made with the thought that visitors will already have knowledge of the subject. However, several are a part of a bigger fansite, used to amplify the fanbase's experience.

History

Decline
In the late 1990s, free services such as GeoCities, Tripod, and AngelFire hosted tens of thousands of fan sites or fan pages. Typically, popular sites would then migrate to independent domain names. Sometimes, fansites launched with an independent domain instead of a free service.  These hobbyists, known as webmasters, launched and built fansites around any topic, such as videogame franchises and entertainment brands (tv series, movies, bands, actors). Nearly all fansites had some type of forum software, such as vBulletin, phpBB, or Invision Power Board. Fansites peaked around 2005, and by the early 2010s, Facebook groups became a popular alternative to independent fansites.

In the 2020s, fansites have faded from existence (accessible on archive.org), although some still operate today.

Motivations

A study suggests that unofficial fansites are often built as an alternative to the "hard sell" approach of official fansites that carry commercial messages. A classification system developed by Wann breaks down eight motives of fandom. These motives, particularly those related to group affiliation and self-esteem, are a driving factor in the creation of unofficial fan sites.

Satisfying the social psychology needs of group affiliation and self-esteem by visiting fansites, and, in particular, participating in the community aspects of fansites, appear to serve to increase fan behavior.

Research on interpersonal attraction indicates that people generally prefer to socialize with those who are similar to them. For example, sports fans fulfill this need by attending sporting events in person. In the online world, fans fulfill this need by building or participating in online fansites.

Many fans prefer to visit unofficial fansites for fan-related services, but still prefer an official fansite as the primary source for accurate information since it affords the closest affiliation with the target itself.

See also
 Fan art
 Fan club
 Fandom
 Fan fiction
 Fan mail

References

Fandom
Websites
Internet culture
Web 1.0